Francis Walter (28 May 1909 – November 2002) was a British cross-country skier. He competed in the men's 18 kilometre event at the 1936 Winter Olympics.

References

1909 births
2002 deaths
British male cross-country skiers
Olympic cross-country skiers of Great Britain
Cross-country skiers at the 1936 Winter Olympics
People from Mödling